The men's K-2 500 metres event was a pairs kayaking event conducted as part of the Canoeing at the 1980 Summer Olympics program.

Medalists

Results

Heats
20 crews were entered into the event on July 30 though two teams did not start. The top three finishers from each of the heats advanced directly to the semifinals while the remaining nine teams were relegated to the repechages.

Repechages
The nine crews first raced in two repechages on July 30. The top three finishers from each of the repechages advanced directly to the semifinals.

Semifinals
The top three finishers in each of the semifinals (raced on August 1) advanced to the final.

Final
The final was held on August 1.

References
1980 Summer Olympics official report Volume 3. p. 185. 
Sport-reference.com 1980 men's K-2 500 m results

Men's K-2 500
Men's events at the 1980 Summer Olympics